Conor Newton (born 17 October 1991) is an English semi-professional and former professional footballer who plays as a central midfielder or right back for South Shields.

Club career

Newcastle United
Newton joined Newcastle United as a youth player at the age of nine and made his debut for their reserve side in 2008 against Blackburn. Following nine months out with a knee injury he looked to go out on loan to gain first team experience. In January 2013, he joined Scottish side St Mirren on loan.

Following his loan spell at St.Mirren, Newton, along with Dummett, both signed a one-year extension.

St Mirren (loan)
After a spell training with the club on 1 January 2013, he joined Scottish Premier League side St Mirren on loan until the end of the season.

At St Mirren, he teamed up with fellow Newcastle player Paul Dummett and was given the squad number twenty four, where he was an un-used substitute, in a 1–1 draw against Kilmarnock. Newton made his debut playing from the start on 19 January, in a 4–1 home defeat to Ross County.

Newton's first goal for the club came in the Scottish Communities League Cup final against Hearts on 17 March 2013, when he collected his first senior medal following St Mirren's 3–2 win. Following the match, Newton says his first major final was a good one and playing in the cup final is such an honour. In addition, Newton says his thoughts about the goal:

A week later, on 6 April 2013, Newton scored his first league goal, in a 2–2 draw against Motherwell, which was the last match before its split. His second goal came up on the final game of the season and provided assist for John McGinn, who scored the opener in the match, as St Mirren would win 3–1 against Kilmarnock.

In the 2013–14 season, Newton returned to St Mirren on loan in his second spell. After making twelve appearances, Newton scored his first goal in his second spell in a 2–1 win over Ross County and followed the second the following week, in a 3–0 win over Partick Thistle. In January, Newton loan spell was extended until the end of the season, making this his first full season at St Mirren.

Newton was a first team regular for the club, and made 41 appearances over the course of the season. The midfielder weighed in with five goals, scoring in his final match against Hearts on 10 May 2014 before his loan spell finished.

Rotherham United
At the end of the 2013–14 season, Newcastle United did not offer Newton a new contract and he joined Rotherham United on a two-year deal.

Cambridge United
On 16 July 2015 he signed a two-year deal with Cambridge United and was allowed to leave after his contract expired.

Hartlepool United
Newton moved back to the North-East signing for National League club Hartlepool United in July 2017. Newton scored his first goal for Pools in November 2017 in a 4–0 win against FC Halifax Town. Newton made 27 league appearances in his first season with the club. At the end of the 2017–18 season, Newton was transfer listed by the club along with six other players. Newton was released by Hartlepool at the end of the 2018–19 season.

Move into semi-professional football
In June 2019, following Newton's release from Hartlepool, he joined Northern League Division One side Whickham on a two-year contract.

South Shields
In August 2022, following a successful trial at Northern Premier League club South Shields, Newton signed a contract ahead of the 2022–23 season until January 2023. Upon signing for Shields, Newton said "I've been out of full-time football for a long time but was given the opportunity to come in and train with the lads and it’s hard not to enjoy the facilities here and the standards throughout the club." He made his debut for Shields on 13 August 2022 in a 2–0 win against Stalybridge Celtic. On 13 December 2022, it was announced that Newton would be unavailable for selection by the club for the foreseeable future due to personal reasons.

Honours
St Mirren
 Scottish League Cup: 2012–13

Career statistics

Personal life
Newton grew up in Whickham, England where he attended Whickham Comprehensive School, until 2008.

References

External links

1991 births
Living people
Footballers from Newcastle upon Tyne
English footballers
Association football midfielders
Newcastle United F.C. players
St Mirren F.C. players
Rotherham United F.C. players
Cambridge United F.C. players
Hartlepool United F.C. players
Whickham F.C. players
Scottish Premier League players
Scottish Professional Football League players